M.A.H. Salim, also known as Silver Salim, is a Bangladesh Nationalist Party politician and the former Member of Parliament from Bagerhat-2.

Career
Salim was elected to parliament from Bagerhat-2 in 2001 as a candidate of Bangladesh Nationalist Party. He served as the President of Bagerhat District unit of Bangladesh Nationalist Party. He is the chairman of Channel 1, a TV channel in Bangladesh. He served as the Chairman of chairman of Bangladesh Association of International Recruiting Agencies.

Salim sued by Mina Raqibul Hasan Milon, Sramik Dal leader, for land grab on 3 June 2007. He was sentenced to five years imprisonment on 3 June 2008 for extorting from construction firm owner in 2003.

Personal life
Salim is married to Amena Begum. They have one daughter, Sahara Selim, and two sons, Mehedi Hassan and Samith Hassan.

References

Living people
Bangladesh Nationalist Party politicians
8th Jatiya Sangsad members
Year of birth missing (living people)
Place of birth missing (living people)